The Kampala–Entebbe Road, also known as the Entebbe–Kampala Road or the Entebbe Road, is a road in the Central Region of Uganda, connecting the capital city of Kampala and Entebbe International Airport.

Location
The road starts on Kampala Road, directly opposite the Kampala Road Branch of the Housing Finance Bank.

Overview
This road is a very busy transport corridor. It is the second-busiest road in the country, after Kampala-Jinja Road. Kampala–Entebbe Road accommodates an estimated 264,000 passengers every day, as of May 2016. Other credible sources quoted traffic on this road at 635,656 vehicles annually, in 2011.
 
Before the opening of the Entebbe–Kampala Expressway, this road was the only direct link between the city center and the international airport. The road is single carriageway, too narrow for the heavy traffic using the road. Because of the congestion, the road is one of the most automobile accident-prone locations in the country.

Points of interest
The following points of interest also lie along or near the road:
Kajjansi is a neighborhood, where several other points of interest are located and where the Munyonyo spur of Entebbe–Kampala Expressway crosses the Kampala–Entebbe Road.
(6) Entebbe International Airport, where the road ends.

See also
 List of roads in Uganda
 Transport in Uganda

References

External links
Flyover won’t decongest Kampala city
Entebbe Expressway to be thrown open in May 2018

Roads in Uganda
Wakiso District
Transport in Kampala
Transport infrastructure in Uganda
Transport infrastructure in Africa